101955 Bennu (provisional designation ) is a carbonaceous asteroid in the Apollo group discovered by the LINEAR Project on 11 September 1999. It is a potentially hazardous object that is listed on the Sentry Risk Table and has the highest cumulative rating on the Palermo Technical Impact Hazard Scale. It has a cumulative 1-in-1,800 chance of impacting Earth between 2178 and 2290 with the greatest risk being on 24 September 2182. It is named after the Bennu, the ancient Egyptian mythological bird associated with the Sun, creation, and rebirth.

Bennu was the target of the OSIRIS-REx mission which is intended to return its samples to Earth in 2023 for further study. On 3 December 2018, the OSIRIS-REx spacecraft arrived at Bennu after a two-year journey. It orbited the asteroid and mapped out Bennu's surface in detail, seeking potential sample collection sites. Analysis of the orbits allowed calculation of Bennu's mass and its distribution.

In October 2020, OSIRIS-REx successfully touched down on the surface of Bennu, collected a sample using an extendable arm, secured the sample and prepared for a return trip to Earth. On 10 May 2021, OSIRIS-REx successfully completed its departure from the Bennu asteroid while still carrying the sample of the asteroid rubble.

Discovery and observation 

Bennu was discovered on 11 September 1999 during a Near-Earth asteroid survey by the Lincoln Near-Earth Asteroid Research (LINEAR). The asteroid was given the provisional designation  and classified as a near-Earth asteroid. Bennu was observed extensively by the Arecibo Observatory and the Goldstone Deep Space Network using radar imaging as Bennu closely approached Earth on 23 September 1999.

Naming 
The name Bennu was selected from more than eight thousand student entries from dozens of countries around the world who entered a "Name That Asteroid!" contest run by the University of Arizona, The Planetary Society, and the LINEAR Project in 2012. Third-grade student Michael Puzio from North Carolina proposed the name in reference to the Egyptian mythological bird Bennu. To Puzio, the OSIRIS-REx spacecraft with its extended TAGSAM arm resembled the Egyptian deity, which is typically depicted as a heron.

Its features will be named after birds and bird-like creatures in mythology.

Physical characteristics 

Bennu has a roughly spheroidal shape, resembling a spinning top. Bennu's axis of rotation is tilted 178 degrees to its orbit; the direction of rotation about its axis is retrograde with respect to its orbit. The boulders contain veins of high albedo carbonate minerals believed to have formed prior to the formation of the asteroid due to hot water channels on the much larger parent body. The veins range from 3 to 15 centimeters wide, and can be over one meter in length, much bigger than carbonate veins seen in meteorites.

There is a well-defined ridge along the equator of Bennu. The presence of this ridge suggests that fine-grained regolith particles have accumulated in this area, possibly because of its low gravity and fast rotation (about once every 4.3 hours). Observations by the OSIRIS-REx spacecraft has shown that Bennu is rotating faster over time. This change in Bennu's rotation is caused by the Yarkovsky–O'Keefe–Radzievskii–Paddack effect, or the YORP effect. Due to the uneven emission of thermal radiation from its surface as Bennu rotates in sunlight, the rotation period of Bennu decreases by about one second every 100 years.

The thermal inertia was measured and found to vary by approximately 19% during each rotational period. It was based on this observation that scientists (incorrectly) estimated a moderate regolith grain size, ranging from several millimeters up to a centimeter, evenly distributed. No emission from a potential dust coma has been detected around Bennu, which puts a limit of 106 g of dust within a radius of 4750 km.

Astrometric observations between 1999 and 2013 have demonstrated that 101955 Bennu is influenced by the Yarkovsky effect, causing the semimajor axis of its orbit to drift on average by  meters/year. Analysis of the gravitational and thermal effects has given a bulk density of ρ =  kg/m3, which is only slightly denser than water. Therefore, the predicted macroporosity is %, suggesting the interior has a rubble pile structure or even hollows.

Photometry and spectroscopy 
It has a B-type classification, which is a sub-category of carbonaceous asteroids. Polarimetric observations show that Bennu belongs to the rare F subclass of carbonaceous asteroids, which is usually associated with cometary features. Measurements over a range of phase angles showed a phase function slope of 0.040 magnitudes per degree, which is similar to other near-Earth asteroids with low albedo.

Before OSIRIS-REx, spectroscopy indicated a correspondence with the CI and/or CM carbonaceous chondrite meteorites, including carbonaceous-chondrite mineral magnetite. Magnetite, a spectrally prominent water product but destroyed by heat, is an important proxy of astronomers including OSIRIS-REx staff.

Water
Predicted beforehand, Dante Lauretta (University of Arizona) then stated that Bennu is water-rich- already detectable while OSIRIS-REx was still technically in approach.

Preliminary spectroscopic surveys of the asteroid's surface by OSIRIS-REx confirmed magnetite and the meteorite-asteroid linkage, dominated by phyllosilicates. Phyllosilicates, among others, hold water.
Bennu's water spectra were detectable on approach, reviewed by outside scientists, then confirmed from orbit.

OSIRIS-REx observations have resulted in a (self-styled) conservative estimate of about 7 x 108 kg water in one form alone, neglecting additional forms. This is a water content of ~1 wt.%, and potentially much more. In turn this suggests transient pockets of water beneath Bennu's regolith. The surficial water may be lost from the collected samples. However, if the sample return capsule maintains low temperatures, the largest (centimeter-scale) fragments may contain measurable quantities of adsorbed water, and some fraction of Bennu's ammonium compounds.

Activity

Scientists hypothesize the releases may be caused by thermal fracturing, volatile release through dehydration of phyllosilicates, pockets of subsurface water, and/or meteoroid impacts.

Before the arrival of OSIRIS-REx, Bennu had displayed polarization consistent with Comet Hale-Bopp and 3200 Phaethon, a rock comet. Bennu, Phaethon, and inactive Manx comets are examples of active asteroids. B-type asteroids displaying a blue color in particular, may be dormant comets. If the IAU declares Bennu to be a dual-status object, its comet designation would be P/ (LINEAR).

Surface features 
All geological features on Bennu are named after various species of birds and bird-like figures in mythology. The first features to be named were the final four candidate OSIRIS-REx sample sites, which were given unofficial names by the team in August 2019. On 6 March 2020 the IAU announced the first official names for 12 Bennu surface features, including regiones (broad geographic regions), craters, dorsa (ridges), fossae (grooves or trenches) and saxa (rocks and boulders).

Analysis showed that the particles making up Bennu's exterior are loosely packed and lightly bound to each other; "The spacecraft would have sunk into Bennu had it not fired its thrusters to back away immediately after it grabbed dust and rock from the asteroid's surface." Analysis also revealed that the Sun's heat fractures rocks on Bennu in just 10,000 to 100,000 years instead of millions of years as was thought before.

Candidate sample sites 

On 12 December 2019, after a year of mapping Bennu's surface, a target site was announced. Named Nightingale, the area is near Bennu's north pole and lies inside a small crater within a larger crater. Osprey was selected as the backup sample site.

IAU named features

Origin and evolution 
The carbonaceous material that composes Bennu originally came from the breakup of a much larger parent body—a planetoid or a proto-planet. But like nearly all other matter in the Solar System, the origins of its minerals and atoms are to be found in dying stars such as red giants and supernovae. According to the accretion theory, this material came together 4.5 billion years ago during the formation of the Solar System.

Bennu's basic mineralogy and chemical nature would have been established during the first 10 million years of the Solar System's formation, where the carbonaceous material underwent some geologic heating and chemical transformation inside a much larger planetoid or a proto-planet capable of producing the requisite pressure, heat and hydration (if need be)—into more complex minerals. Bennu probably began in the inner asteroid belt as a fragment from a larger body with a diameter of 100 km. Simulations suggest a 70% chance it came from the Polana family and a 30% chance it derived from the Eulalia family. Impactors on boulders of Bennu indicate that Bennu has been in near earth orbit (separated from the main asteroid belt) for 1–2.5 million years.

Subsequently, the orbit drifted as a result of the Yarkovsky effect and mean motion resonances with the giant planets, such as Jupiter and Saturn. Various interactions with the planets in combination with the Yarkovsky effect modified the asteroid, possibly changing its spin, shape, and surface features.

Cellino et al. have suggested a possible cometary origin for Bennu, based on similarities of its spectroscopic properties with known comets. This includes rock comet 3200 Phaethon, originally discovered as, and still numbered as an asteroid.

Orbit 

Bennu currently orbits the Sun with a period of 1.20 years (437 days). Earth gets as close as about 480,000 km (0.0032 au) from its orbit around 23 to 25 September. On 22 September 1999 Bennu passed 0.0147 au from Earth, and six years later on 20 September 2005 it passed 0.033 au from Earth. The next close approaches of less than 0.09 au will be 30 September 2054 and then 23 September 2060, which will perturb the orbit slightly. Between the close approach of 1999 and that of 2060, Earth completes 61 orbits and Bennu 51. An even closer approach will occur on 25 September 2135 around 0.0014 au (see below). In the 75 years between the 2060 and 2135 approaches, Bennu completes 64 orbits, meaning its period will have changed to 1.17 years (427 days). The Earth approach of 2135 will increase the orbital period to about 1.24 years (452 days).

Possible Earth impact 
On average, an asteroid with a diameter of  can be expected to impact Earth about every 130,000 years or so. A 2010 dynamical study by Andrea Milani and collaborators predicted a series of eight potential Earth impacts by Bennu between 2169 and 2199. The cumulative probability of impact is dependent on physical properties of Bennu that were poorly known at the time, but was found to not exceed 0.071% for all eight encounters. The authors recognized that an accurate assessment of 's probability of Earth impact would require a detailed shape model and additional observations (either from the ground or from spacecraft visiting the object) to determine the magnitude and direction of the Yarkovsky effect.

The publication of the shape model and of astrometry based on radar observations obtained in 1999, 2005, and 2011 made possible an improved estimate of the Yarkovsky acceleration and a revised assessment of the impact probability. In 2014, the best estimate of the impact probability was a cumulative probability of 0.037% in the interval 2175 to 2196. This corresponds to a cumulative score on the Palermo scale of −1.71. If an impact were to occur, the expected kinetic energy associated with the collision would be 1,200 megatons in TNT equivalent (for comparison, TNT equivalent of Little Boy was approx 0.015 megaton).

The 2021 orbit solution extended the virtual impactors from the year 2200 to the year 2300 and slightly increased the cumulative Palermo impact scale to −1.42. The solution even included the estimated masses of 343 other asteroids and represents about 90% of the total mass of the main asteroid belt.

2060/2135 close approaches 

Bennu will pass  from Earth on 23 September 2060, while the Moon's average orbital distance (Lunar Distance, LD) is  today and will be 384,404 km in 50 years time. It will be too dim to be seen with common binoculars. The close approach of 2060 causes divergence in the close approach of 2135. On 25 September 2135, the Earth approach distance is  ±20 thousand km. There is no chance of an Earth impact in 2135. The 2135 approach will create many lines of variations and Bennu may pass through a gravitational keyhole during the 2135 passage which could create an impact scenario at a future encounter. The keyholes are all less than ~20 km wide with some keyholes being only 5 meters wide.

2182 
The most threatening virtual impactor is on 24 September 2182 when there is a 1 in 2,700 chance of an Earth impact, but the asteroid could be as far as the Sun is from Earth. To impact Earth on 24 September 2182 Bennu needs to pass through a keyhole roughly 5 km wide on 25 September 2135. The next two biggest risks occur in 2187 (1:14,000) and 2192 (1:26,000). There is a cumulative 1 in 1,800 chance of an Earth impact between 2178 and 2290.

Long term 
Lauretta et al. reported in 2015 their results of a computer simulation, concluding that it is more likely that 101955 Bennu will be destroyed by some other cause:

The orbit of Bennu is intrinsically dynamically unstable, as are those of all NEOs. In order to glean probabilistic insights into the future evolution and likely fate of Bennu beyond a few hundred years, we tracked 1,000 virtual "Bennus" for an interval of 300 Myr with the gravitational perturbations of the planets Mercury–Neptune included. Our results ... indicate that Bennu has a 48% chance of falling into the Sun. There is a 10% probability that Bennu will be ejected out of the inner Solar System, most likely after a close encounter with Jupiter. The highest impact probability for a planet is with Venus (26%), followed by the Earth (10%) and Mercury (3%). The odds of Bennu striking Mars are only 0.8% and there is a 0.2% chance that Bennu will eventually collide with Jupiter.

Meteor shower 
As an active asteroid with a small minimum orbit intersection distance from Earth, Bennu may be the parent body of a weak meteor shower. Bennu particles would radiate around 25 September from the southern constellation of Sculptor. The meteors are expected to be near the naked eye limit and only produce a Zenith hourly rate of less than 1.

OSIRIS-REx 

The OSIRIS-REx mission of NASA's New Frontiers program was launched towards  on 8 September 2016. On 3 December 2018, the spacecraft arrived at the asteroid Bennu after a two-year journey. One week later, at the American Geophysical Union Fall Meeting, investigators announced that OSIRIS-REx had discovered spectroscopic evidence for hydrated minerals on the surface of the asteroid, implying that liquid water was present in Bennu's parent body before it split off. 

On 20 October 2020, OSIRIS-REx descended to the asteroid and "pogo-sticked off" it while successfully collecting a sample. OSIRIS-REx is expected to return samples to Earth in 2023 via a capsule-drop by parachute, ultimately, from the spacecraft to the Earth's surface in Utah on 24 September. On 7 April 2021, OSIRIS-REx completed its final flyover of the asteroid and began slowly drifting away from it. On 10 May 2021, the departure was completed with OSIRIS-REx while still managing to contain the asteroid sample.

Selection 
The asteroid Bennu was selected from over half a million known asteroids by the OSIRIS-REx selection committee. The primary constraint for selection was close proximity to Earth, since proximity implies low impulse (Δv) required to reach an object from Earth orbit. Furthermore, the candidate asteroid for a sample-return mission must have loose regolith on its surface, which implies a diameter greater than 200 meters. Asteroids smaller than this typically spin too fast to retain dust or small particles. Finally, a desire to find an asteroid with pristine carbon material from the early Solar System, possibly including volatile molecules and organic compounds, reduced the list further.

With the above criteria applied, five asteroids remained as candidates for the OSIRIS-REx mission, and Bennu was chosen, in part for its potentially hazardous orbit.

Gallery

See also 
 List of minor planets and comets visited by spacecraft
 , provisional target of the cancelled Asteroid Redirect Mission
 162173 Ryugu, an asteroid being studied by JAXA concurrent with the NASA mission to 101955 Bennu
 73P/Schwassmann–Wachmann, a disintegrating-comet

References

External links 

 Video (2:53) – Asteroid Bennu Mission Overview (NASA; 11 May 2021).
 Video (01:12) – Asteroid Bennu ejecting material into space (CNN; 5 December 2019)
 Video (01:32) – OSIRIS REx's approach to asteroid Bennu (NASA; 7 January 2019)
 Earth Impact Risk Summary: 101955 1999 RQ36 (Years: 2175–2199) – Jet Propulsion Laboratory near-Earth object site
 NEODyS-2 Ephemerides for 2135 (step size: 10 days)
 
 
 
 Nominal and impacting solution for 2182
 
 

Apollo asteroids
Potentially hazardous asteroids
Active asteroids
Discoveries by LINEAR
Bennu
Potential impact events caused by near-Earth objects
Minor planets visited by spacecraft
Bennu
Articles containing video clips
19990911
B-type asteroids (SMASS)